The Delian Mode is a Canadian short documentary film, directed by Kara Blake and released in 2009. The film is a profile of Delia Derbyshire, a British composer best known for arranging the theme music to Doctor Who. It takes its name from the title of a piece of incidental music that Derbyshire wrote in the 1960s.

The film premiered at the Hot Docs Canadian International Documentary Festival, where it won the award for Best Short Documentary. The film won the Genie Award for Best Short Documentary Film at the 30th Genie Awards.

References

External links

2009 films
Canadian short documentary films
Best Short Documentary Film Genie and Canadian Screen Award winners
Documentary films about women in music
2000s English-language films
2000s Canadian films
2009 short documentary films